Paramé is a former town and commune of France on the north coast of Brittany. Paramé merged with Saint-Servan to form the commune of Saint-Malo in 1967. Paramé is now a district of Saint-Malo and its seaside resort. The town is known for its long sandy beach and its sea spa.

Seaside resorts in France
Former communes of Ille-et-Vilaine
Saint-Malo